Dobatia is a monotypic genus of gastropods belonging to the family Clausiliidae. The only species is Dobatia goettingi.

The species is found in Japan.

References

Clausiliidae